Togo competed at the 2010 Summer Youth Olympics, the inaugural Youth Olympic Games, held in Singapore from 14 August to 26 August 2010.

Athletics

Girls
Track and Road Events

Judo

Individual

Swimming

Taekwondo

References

External links
Competitors List: Togo – Singapore 2010 official site

2010 in Togolese sport
Nations at the 2010 Summer Youth Olympics
Togo at the Youth Olympics